Alexander Vladimirovich Denisyev (born 29 July 1991) is a Russian luger. Denisyev, together with Vladislav Antonov, participated in doubles and in team relay competitions at the 2014 Winter Olympics. Denisyev and Antonov came fifth in the doubles, and, together with Tatiana Ivanova and Albert Demchenko, they won the silver medal in the team relay.

Denisyev was later stripped of that medal, after Albert Demchenko and Tatiana Ivanova were banned for doping violations on 22 December 2017, and the results of the Russian team were annulled. On 1 February 2018, their results were restored as a result of the successful appeal.

He and Vladislav Antonov became the first Russians in post-Soviet era to win a WC stage, doing this in the Sochi stage of the 2018–19 Luge World Cup.

World Cup podiums

References

External links

Russian male lugers
Olympic lugers of Russia
Lugers at the 2014 Winter Olympics
Lugers at the 2018 Winter Olympics
Lugers at the 2022 Winter Olympics
1991 births
Living people
Sportspeople from Krasnoyarsk
Olympic silver medalists for Russia
Olympic medalists in luge
Medalists at the 2014 Winter Olympics